Karlık is a village in the İskilip District of Çorum Province in Turkey. Its population is 143 (2022). The village is populated by Kurds.

References

Villages in İskilip District
Kurdish settlements in Çorum Province